Garla is a mandal in Mahabubabad district, Telangana.

References

Mandals in Mahabubabad district